Samuel Batteley was one of the two MPs for Bury St Edmunds between 1712 and 1713.

References

Batteley